Lycogrammoides is a monospecific genus of marine ray-finned fish belonging to the family Zoarcidae, the eelpouts. Its only species is Lycogrammoides schmidti, a rare species of the Sea of Okhotsk in the northwestern Pacific Ocean.

Taxonomy
Lycogrammoides was first proposed as a monospecific genus in 1928 by the Soviet zoologists Vladimir Soldatov and Georgiĭ Ustinovich Lindberg when they described Lycogrammoides schmidti. This genus is classified within the subfamily Lycodinae, one of 4 subfamilies in the family Zoarcidae, the eelpouts. This genus is the sister taxon to Bothrocara, Bothrocarina and Lycodapus, and these four genera form a clade within the subfamily Lycodinae.

Etymology
Lycogrammoides means having the form of Lycogrammus, a synonym of Bothrocara. The specific name honours the Soviet ichthyologist and worker on the fishes of the Russian Far East, Peter Schmidt.

Characteristics
Lycogrammoides is characterised within the Lycodinae by having 6 suborbital bones and 6, rarely 7, pores.The males have canine like teeth. The flesh is gelatinous and scales extend quite far on to the head, reaching the cheek and nose. There is a pseudobranch, a pyloric  caeca,  a lateral  line, vomerine  and palatine  teeth while they lack an  oral  valve  and  pelvic  fins. There are 9 fin rays in the pectoral fin.

Distribution and habitat
Lycogrammoides is only known from the Sea of Okhotsk’s outer shelf.

References

Lycodinae
Monotypic ray-finned fish genera